Acacia crassa, commonly known as the curracabah, is a species of Acacia native to eastern Australia.

Description
The angled stout branchlets are light or dark grey or red-brown and often have distinct lenticels. The evergreen phyllodes have a narrowly elliptic shape that gradually tapers both ends. It flowers between July and October, the further south the later it flowers. It produces a flower-spike with a length of  densely packed with golden flowers.

Distribution
Its range follows along the line of the Great Dividing Range from around Mackay in Queensland to about Newcastle in New South Wales where it is found on sandstone and rocky conglomerate areas growing in gravelly, sandy, sandy loam or clayey soils. It is usually a part of sclerophyll woodland, heath or open scrub communities.

Taxonomy
The species was first formally described by the botanist Leslie Pedley in 1974 in the work Contributions from the Queensland Herbarium. It was reclassified by Pedley in 1987 as Racosperma crassum, then transferred back to the genus Acacia in 2001.

There are two known subspecies:
Acacia crassa Pedley subsp. crassa
Acacia crassa subsp. longicoma Pedley

The shrub is a member of the Acacia cunninghamii group and is closely related to Acacia concurrens , Acacia leiocalyx , Acacia longispicata and Acacia tingoorensis.

See also
 List of Acacia species

References

crassa
Fabales of Australia
Flora of New South Wales
Flora of Queensland
Plants described in 1974
Taxa named by Leslie Pedley